Charles Mathes (born 1949) is an American author of mystery novels.

His books include:

"Spirit of America, A State by State Celebration" 1990 (Introduction by Bob Hope)
"Treasures of American Museums" 1991
"The Girl With The Phony Name" 1992
"The Girl Who Remembered Snow" 1996
"The Girl At The End of the Line" 1999
"The Girl in the Face of the Clock" 2001
"In Every Moon There Is A Face" 2003 (Illustrated by Arlene Graston).

References 

Books by Charles Mathes (WorldCat)

External links
Author's website 
Macmillan
Author's Papers at Dept. of Special Collections, Olin Library, Washington University in St Louis, MO

20th-century American novelists
21st-century American novelists
American male novelists
American mystery writers
Novelists from Ohio
1949 births
Living people
20th-century American male writers
21st-century American male writers